Ahlus Sunnah Wal Jamaah, Ahlu's-Sunnah wa’l-Jama’ah, Ahl-e Sunnat wa’l-Jamaat, and other variants may refer to:
 Ahl al-Sunnah wa'l-Jamaah, a name commonly used for the Barelvi Sunni revivalist movement in South Asia
 Sunni Islam, Ahl as-Sunna wa-l-jama being the classical (Arabic), long-form term for Sunni Islam
 Ahlus Sunnah Wal Jam'ah Association of Australia, a Sunni organisation
 Ahlu Sunna Waljama'a, a Somalian militant group